Football Club de La Chapelle-des-Marais is a French association football club founded in 1989. They are based in the town of La Chapelle-des-Marais, Loire-Atlantique and their home stadium is the Stade Municipal de la Perriere. As of the 2009–10 season, they play in the Championnat de France amateur 2 Group H.

The club reached the 8th round of the 1998–99 Coupe de France.

References

External links
FC La Chapelle-des-Marais official website 

La Chapelle-des-Marais
La Chapelle-des-Marais
1989 establishments in France
Football clubs in Loire-Atlantique